Maria Judith Remenyi (born December 13, 1945 in Denmark) is a Danish-American astrophysicist, cosmologist and beauty pageant titleholder who held the title of Miss USA 1966.

Early life
Remenyi was born in Copenhagen, Denmark and grew up in Hungary after her father was transferred to an army post there. She migrated to the United States in 1956 when her family escaped from the Hungarian revolt.

Miss USA
Remenyi, residing in El Cerrito, California at the time, represented California at the Miss USA 1966 pageant held in Miami in May 1966.  She was voted Miss Pixable by the press. On 22 May 1966 she became the second Californian to win the Miss USA title.  
In July she competed in the Miss Universe 1966 pageant, placing in the top fifteen.

In 1973 Remenyi was invited to judge the Miss Universe 1973 pageant.

Life after Miss USA
Prior to winning the Miss USA title she was a junior studying astrophysics at the University of California at Berkeley and was involved in bevatron research and computer programming at the Lawrence Radiation Laboratory.  She dropped out after winning Miss USA and transferred to Columbia University, stating that she had fallen in love with New York during her reign.

References

External links
Miss USA official website

1946 births
Living people
Miss Photogenic at Miss USA
Miss Universe 1966 contestants
Miss USA 1960s delegates
Miss USA winners
People from El Cerrito, California